Children's Mercy Kansas City is a 390 bed comprehensive pediatric medical center in Kansas City, Missouri, that integrates clinical care, research and medical education to provide care for pediatric patients from birth through adulthood. The hospital's primary service area covers a 150-county area in Missouri and Kansas. Children's Mercy has received national recognition from U.S. News & World Report in 10 pediatric specialties. The hospital was the first in Missouri and Kansas to receive Magnet Recognition for excellence in nursing services from the American Nurses Credentialing Center, and has been re-designated five times.

Children's Mercy Hospital is the primary location for Children's Mercy Kansas City, a comprehensive pediatric health system with multiple locations in Missouri and Kansas. The not-for-profit hospital was founded in 1897 by two sisters, one a surgeon and the other a dentist, to provide care for poor and sick children. The hospital quickly grew and expanded services to all children in the region. According to the hospital's Community Benefit Report, in their fiscal year 2021, the hospital provided more than $119 million in uncompensated care, which includes charity care, unreimbursed Medicaid and other means-tested government programs, and subsidized health services.

History

Berry sisters

Katharine and Alice Berry came to Kansas City from Wisconsin in 1893. They put each other through school; Katharine being the first to get her medical degree while Alice worked as a schoolteacher, and then obtained her dentist degree—both male-only professions during the 19th century. The women were excluded from professional medical groups because of their gender, and their entrepreneurial spirit discouraged. But the two persevered and due to their widowed status, were permitted to control their own finances, which they poured into their medical work with children.

Children's Mercy Hospital was founded in 1897 when Dr. Katharine Berry Richardson, now a surgeon, and her sister Dr. Alice Berry Graham, a dentist, found a crippled, malnourished girl abandoned in the streets of Kansas City, Missouri and treated and cared for her at a rented bed in a hospital. Since no hospital in the city allowed a woman physician on the staff, the sisters continued treating patients by renting beds in a small hospital.

The bed soon became known as the "Mercy Bed", and the need for health care for children continued to grow. The sisters formed the Free Bed Fund Association for Crippled Deformed and Ruptured Children and in 1901, adopted the Mercy name; changing it to The Children's Mercy Hospital in 1919.

At first, the public ridiculed the sisters' work, especially the Berry sisters' ardent belief of women-only staffers. Many believed women should work in the home and not be physicians. But as the hospital progressed and showed miraculous outcomes, the ridicule lessened and public opinion soon helped the hospital strive.

Giving all they had, the sisters bought a home in 1903 to work as a hospital, sheltering children. The sisters and few staff members begged for supplies, volunteers, and monetary support. Dr. Kate (Katharine Richardson) would keep a sign near the street, letting the public know the needs of the hospital, such as the basic comforts of new sheets, pillow cases, bath towels and canned food.

In 1915, construction on what would be the first official hospital began at Independence Avenue. The hospital flourished in its new home until 1970, when it moved to its current location on Hospital Hill.

When Hurricane Katrina first hit New Orleans in August 2005, Children's Mercy (along with other hospitals) sent helicopters to Tulane Medical Center, Ochsner, and CHNOLA in order to help evacuate pediatric patients from the hospital. Along with helicopters, CMH sent two C-130s to aid in large scale evacuation of pediatric patients from New Orleans.

Timeline
Significant events in the hospital's history include:

 1897: Free Bed Fund Association of Sick, Crippled, Deformed and Ruptured Children opened its doors with one rented bed on June 24.
 1901: Central Governing Board of the Free Bed Fund approves the Mercy name.
 1903: Officially called Mercy Hospital, the new hospital opens in its own building with five beds at 414 Highland Avenue. 
 1917: The hospital moves to Independence and Woodland on November 27. 
 1970: Hospital staff moves 39 children to the hospital's current location, on Hospital Hill 2401 Gillham Road. 
 1995: Five-story Hall Family Outpatient Center opens 
 1996: Seven-story Herman and Helen Sutherland Inpatient Tower open.
 1997: Children's Mercy South opens in Overland Park, Kansas in October.
 2000: The Paul and Betty Henson Patient Tower, a complement to the Sutherland Tower, opens. 
 2003: Awarded Magnet designation for nursing excellence, the first hospital in Missouri or Kansas and just the third children's hospital to achieve this honor from the American Nurses Credentialing Center.
 2003: Pediatric Research Center opens on top two floors of the new Clinic and Research Building on Hospital Hill.
 2004: Children's Mercy South expansion opens. Renamed Children's Mercy Hospital - Kansas in 2015 
 2009: Bioethics Center opens.
 2012: Children's Mercy East opens in Independence, Missouri 
 2012: The Elizabeth Ann Hall Patient Tower opens on Hospital Hill. 
 2012: Children's Mercy opens the Center for Pediatric Genomic Medicine.
 2013: Children's Mercy Blue Valley opens in Overland Park, Kansas, housing urgent care and sports medicine services, including a gym for sports therapy and rehabilitation.  
 2013: Children's Mercy Wichita, a regional referral center opens in Wichita, Kansas. 
 2015: Children's Mercy performs its first heart transplant.
 2020: Children's Mercy Furlough's 575 Employees and permanently lays off 60 for the first time in the history of the hospital.
2021: Children's Mercy opens the Children's Mercy Research Institute in a new, 9-story, 375,000 square-foot building.
 2022: Children's Mercy recognizes 125th anniversary.

Locations
Children's Mercy has multiple sites of care, including one hospital in Overland Park, Kansas and another in downtown Kansas City, Missouri.

Research

The research program at the Children's Mercy Research Institute features 375,000 square-feet of dedicated clinical research space and over 100 physicians and scientists actively participating in research studies.

It is one of the 10 stakeholder institutions in the Kansas City Area Life Sciences Institute, which also includes the University of Kansas, MRI Global, the University of Missouri-Kansas City and the Stowers Institute.

The hospital's research is focused on five areas of emphasis:
 Genomic Medicine
 Precision Therapeutics
 Population Health
 Health Care Innovation
 Emerging Infections

The hospital is one of 13 designated Pediatric Pharmacology Research Units. Hospital clinical pharmacologists work closely with the Pediatric Trials Network, researching and developing accurate drug doses and devices for children.

The hospital's Genomic Medicine Center was termed "among the most technologically advanced in the world" in a January 2014 Bloomberg article. In 2012, the hospital's Center for Pediatric Genomic Medicine's development of a rapid whole genome sequencing approach was named one of Time magazine's Top 10 Medical Breakthroughs.

Genomic Answers for Kids (GA4K), which began in 2019, is the pediatric data repository to facilitate the search for answers and novel treatments for these conditions. In 2022, GA4K reported having identified 1,000 rare diagnoses and has enrolled more than 10,000 participants to date into GA4K.

Clinical care
Children's Mercy Hospital is located on the Children's Mercy Adele Hall campus. Hospital services include a Level 1 Children's Surgery Center; a Level 1 Trauma Center; a Level IV Intensive Care Nursery; heart, liver, kidney, blood and marrow transplant programs; and more than 40 pediatric subspecialty clinics.

Academics
Children's Mercy is an Accreditation Council of Graduate Medical Education Institutional Sponsor and focuses on the development of programs based on the ACGME core competencies and the acquisition of clinical skills.

Children's Mercy is academically affiliated with both the University of Missouri-Kansas City School of Medicine and the University of Kansas and offers a pediatric residency program that annually accepts 27 categorical pediatric residents, one preliminary resident, three combined pediatrics/neurology residents and six internal medicine/pediatrics residents. Children's Mercy also offers 42 subspecialty fellowship programs to train the next generation of pediatric subspecialists.

In addition, Children's Mercy hosts over 600 residents from partnering instutions in Kansas, Missouri, Oklahoma and Nebraska. Several hundred health care students rotate through Children's Mercy annually.

Rankings and performance

Children's Mercy Hospital is one of 89 facilities in the United States that made national rankings in at least one of 10 pediatric specialties analyzed for the 2022-23 Best Children's Hospitals, by U.S. News & World Report. The hospital has consecutively been nationally ranked in at least 10 of the 10 pediatric specialty areas:
 Cancer
 Cardiology and heart surgery
 Diabetes and endocrinology
 Gastroenterology and GI surgery
 Neonatology
 Nephrology
 Neurology and neurosurgery
 Orthopedics
 Pulmonology and lung surgery
 Urology
	
The highest ranking is nephrology at #4.

The hospital has been designated a "Magnet Recognized" center by the American Nurses Credentialing Center.

Children's Mercy earned "LGBTQ Healthcare Equality Leader" designation in 2022 by receiving a top score of 100 on Human Rights Campaign (HRC) Foundation's Healthcare Equality Index (HEI). 

Children's Mercy earned Forbes' "America's Best-In-State Employers Missouri" designation in 2022 by ranking among the final list of employers that received the most recommendations. Children's Mercy ranked second for the best employer in the state of Missouri.

Children's Mercy earned the 2022-2023 Platinum Level Healthy KC Certified from the Greater Kansas City Chamber of Commerce.

Naming rights

On November 19, 2015, Children's Mercy announced a ten-year partnership with Sporting Kansas City. The deal includes Children's Mercy getting the naming rights to the team's stadium, now named Children's Mercy Park, as well as the team's training center and the championship field and training center at Swope Soccer Village. The partnership focuses on strengthening the community by improving access to pediatric-trained sports medicine, protecting youth athletes and providing education to coaches and parents. In 2017, the hospital opened a Sports Medicine and Rehabilitation Center at the United States Soccer Federation National Training Center, in Kansas.

Controversy

In March 2022, Missouri senator Mike Cierpiot accused Children's Mercy of abusing child welfare services to remove children from the parents' home.

References

External links

 

Buildings and structures in Kansas City, Missouri
Children's hospitals in the United States
Companies based in Kansas City, Missouri
Hospital buildings completed in 1916
Hospital buildings completed in 1970
Hospitals in Kansas
Hospitals in Kansas City, Missouri
1916 establishments in Missouri
1970 establishments in Missouri
Pediatric trauma centers